Laattaouia or El Attaouia is a town in El Kelaa des Sraghna Province, Marrakesh-Safi, Morocco. According to the 2014 census it has a population of 30,315.

References

Populated places in El Kelâat Es-Sraghna Province
Municipalities of Morocco